Madigan Nunatak is an isolated nunatak that rises above the continental ice  south of Cape Gray, Antarctica. It was discovered by the Australasian Antarctic Expedition (1911–14) under Douglas Mawson, who named it for Cecil T. Madigan, the meteorologist with the expedition.

References

Nunataks of George V Land